The Burundian Ambassador to Germany is the official representative of the Government of Burundi to the Government of Germany.
The Ambassador with residence in Berlin is concurrently accredited to the Holy See.

List of representatives

References 

Ambassadors of Burundi to Germany
Germany
Burundi